Annie Silverstein is an American film director and screenwriter.

Early life
Annie was born and raised in Oakland, California. She graduated from Macalester College. with a BA in American History, and in 2013 received an MFA in Film Production from the University of Texas at Austin.

Career

Silverstein's short documentary Noc na Tanečku: Night at the Dance premiered at SXSW in 2011. She returned to SXSW the following year with her fiction short Spark.

In 2014 Silverstein's short film Skunk premiered at the Cannes Film Festival - Cinefondation and won the first place jury award, presided over by Abbas Kiarostami. She was named one of Filmmaker Magazine's 25 New Faces of Indie Film in 2014.

Silverstein's feature debut Bull was selected for the 2016 Sundance Screenwriter's Lab and Directors Lab. Bull premiered at the 2019 Cannes Film Festival - Un Certain Regard, and went on to screen at the Deauville American Film Festival where it won the Grand Prize, Revelation Prize, and Critics’ Prize. Bull premiered in the US at Film Independent's ‘New Wave,’ and was selected to screen in the Festival Favorites section at SXSW 2020. Bull was acquired by Samuel Goldwyn Films (domestic) and Sony Pictures Worldwide (international).

Silverstein often cites the 10 years she spent as a youth worker prior to film school as her greatest influence. In 2004, Silverstein co-founded Longhouse Media,  a non-profit indigenous media arts organization, based in Seattle, in partnership with the Swinomish Indian Tribal Community.  Longhouse Media's “Native Lens” program teaches Native youth in rural and urban settings filmmaking as a form of inquiry, community development, and cultural pride and preservation. In 2007 Silverstein received a Fulbright scholarship to spend a year in Rio de Janeiro, teaching a weekly filmmaking and media literacy course at an orphanage for teenage boys. For her work with Longhouse Media, Silverstein received the National Association for Media Literacy Award for outstanding contributions made in the field of media education in 2009.

Personal life
Annie is married to screenwriter and producer Johnny McAllister. They frequently collaborate on scripts together, and co-wrote Bull. They have two children. Annie is the sister of Jake Silverstein, editor of the New York Times Magazine.

Filmography

References 

American women film directors
American women screenwriters
Screenwriters from California
Film directors from California
21st-century American women writers
Writers from Oakland, California
Macalester College alumni
University of Texas at Austin alumni
Year of birth missing (living people)
Living people
21st-century American screenwriters